Momisis submonticola is a species of beetle in the family Cerambycidae. It was described by Breuning in 1968. It is known from China and Laos.

References

Astathini
Beetles described in 1968